Doris May (born Helen Garrett; October 15, 1902 – May 12, 1984), was an American actress of the silent era. She appeared in 29 films between 1917 and 1927, generally as a leading lady. Most of her roles were in westerns and comedies, although she also starred in some melodramas.

May married actor and producer Wallace MacDonald in 1921, and they remained wed until his death in 1978.

Partial filmography
 His Mother's Boy (1917)
 The Hired Man (1918)
 Playing the Game (1918)
 Green Eyes (1918)
 The Law of the North (1918)
 The Girl Dodger (1919)
 Hay Foot, Straw Foot (1919)
 23 1/2 Hours' Leave (1919)
 What's Your Husband Doing? (1920)
 Mary's Ankle (1920)
 Let's Be Fashionable (1920)
 The Jailbird (1920)
 The Rookie's Return (1920)
 Peck's Bad Boy (1921)
 The Foolish Matrons (1921)
 Eden and Return (1921)
 The Bronze Bell (1921)
 The Foolish Age (1921)
 Up and at 'Em (1922)
 The Understudy (1922)
 Gay and Devilish (1922)
 Boy Crazy (1922)
 The Gunfighter (1923)
 The Common Law (1923)
 Conductor 1492 (1924)
 The Deadwood Coach (1924)
 Faithful Wives (1926)

References

Bibliography
 Ken Wlaschin. The Silent Cinema in Song, 1896-1929: An Illustrated History and Catalog of Songs Inspired by the Movies and Stars, with a List of Recordings. McFarland & Company, 2009.

External links

1902 births
1984 deaths
American film actresses
Actresses from Seattle
20th-century American actresses
Western (genre) film actresses